was the second of the sixty-nine stations of the Nakasendō highway connecting Edo with Kyoto during the Edo period. It was located in the present-day city of Warabi, Saitama Prefecture, Japan.

History
Warabi was originally built up as a castle town during the Muromachi period for the Shibukawa clan. Under the Tokugawa shogunate of the Edo period, Warabi-shuku became a post town on the Nakasendō from 1612.

Until the late Edo period, Warabi-shuku was infamous for its aggressive meshimori onna and numerous chaya.

Warabi-shuku was approximately 4 ri, 28-chō (18.8 kilometers) from the starting point of the Nakasendō at Nihonbashi, which was the approximate distance the average traveler could walk in half a day. However, the station was separated from neighboring Itabashi-shuku by the Arakawa River. The river formed an outer line of defense for Edo, and therefore the Tokugawa shogunate forbid the erection of any bridges as a defensive measure.

The modern city of Warabi has preserved the gate and part of one of the honjin as a museum.

Warabi-shuku in The Sixty-nine Stations of the Kiso Kaidō
Keisai Eisen's ukiyo-e print of Warabi-shuku dates from 1835–1838, and depicts the ferry crossing the Arakawa River at dusk. On the small boat are a pair of itinerant blind women musicians with shamisen, a man and his horse, and a porter sitting smoking in the bow. The boatman propels the boat with a rear oar, while on the far bank more travelled await the arrival of the ferry.

Neighboring post towns
Nakasendō
Itabashi-shuku - Warabi-shuku - Urawa-shuku

References

External links
Hiroshige Kiso-Kaido series
on Kiso Kaido Road

Notes

Stations of the Nakasendō
Stations of the Nakasendō in Saitama Prefecture
Musashi Province